Anne van Olst (born 25 March 1962 in Aalborg, Nordjylland), also known as Anne Koch Jensen, is a Danish dressage rider. She was part of the Bronze winning Danish team at the Olympic games in Beijing 2008 and finished 23rd in the individual dressage at the 2012 Summer Olympics, riding Clearwater.

In 1991 Anne married to the Dutch breeder and horse dealer Gert-Jan van Olst and moved to The Netherlands. Together they run a sport and breeding stable in Den Hout, Netherlands. Anne is also active as trainer and coaches several international riders, including her pupil Charlotte Fry.

References

External links
 
 

Living people
1962 births
Danish female equestrians
Danish dressage riders
Olympic equestrians of Denmark
Olympic bronze medalists for Denmark
Olympic medalists in equestrian
Equestrians at the 1988 Summer Olympics
Equestrians at the 1992 Summer Olympics
Equestrians at the 2000 Summer Olympics
Equestrians at the 2008 Summer Olympics
Equestrians at the 2012 Summer Olympics
Medalists at the 2008 Summer Olympics
Sportspeople from Aalborg
Danish people of Dutch descent